The 1954 Swiss Grand Prix was a Formula One motor race held at Bremgarten on 22 August 1954. It was race 7 of 9 in the 1954 World Championship of Drivers. The 66-lap race was won by Mercedes driver Juan Manuel Fangio after he started from second position. José Froilán González finished second for the Ferrari team and Fangio's teammate Hans Herrmann came in third.

Race report 

The Mercedes dominance continued as Juan Manuel Fangio led from start to finish. Stirling Moss soon passed José Froilán González for 2nd and battled ferociously to catch Fangio. However, he was himself soon under pressure as Mike Hawthorn caught him. The two duelled furiously in a superb patriotic spectacle, which ended only when Moss's engine gave way. Hawthorn himself succumbed to fuel feed problems. Gonzalez thus ended in second, whilst Fangio lapped the entire field up to second, winning by nearly a minute. Hans Herrmann in the sister Mercedes took the final podium spot.

The Driver's championship was to be decided at this race. Works Ferrari driver José Froilán González needed to win to stay in contention to beat Mercedes driver Juan Manuel Fangio on points and after finishing 2nd to Fangio, he still had 23 1/7 points to Fangio's 42. With the rules in place at the time, González could not overhaul Fangio's total with 2 races left, and so the title went to Fangio for the 2nd time.

This would be the last F1 race in Switzerland. Following the 1955 Le Mans disaster the Swiss government banned all forms of motor racing. Swiss Grands Prix were subsequently held in 1975 (non-championship) and 1982 but both races took place in France.

There would not be any form of circuit motor racing in Switzerland for nearly sixty four years. In 2015, Switzerland lifted their ban on motor racing for electric vehicles only. The first race organized after the ban was lifted was a Formula E Championship race taking place in the streets of Zürich in 2018.

Classification

Qualifying

Race 

Notes
 – Includes 1 point for fastest lap

Championship standings after the race 
Drivers' Championship standings

Note: Only the top five positions are included. Only the best 5 results counted towards the Championship. Numbers without parentheses are Championship points; numbers in parentheses are total points scored.

References

Swiss Grand Prix
Swiss Grand Prix
Grand Prix
Swiss Grand Prix